The Useful Space Principle, or USP, in the game of contract bridge was first articulated in a series of six articles in The Bridge World, published from November 1980 through April 1981. (The International Bridge Press Association awarded its 1981/1982 award for Best Article or Series on a System or Convention to Jeff Rubens for this series.) The USP is expressed succinctly in The Bridge World glossary as "a partnership's assigning meanings to actions so that the remaining bidding space matches the needs of the auction."

The articles on the USP were the genesis of widely used conventional methods such as Kickback and transfer advances of overcalls. The USP tells bidding theorists that bidding space should be allocated where it is most needed.

A USP example: Kickback
The Blackwood convention, as originally formulated, violates the USP. Suppose that the agreed trump suit is spades. After the Blackwood "asker" bids 4NT, "teller" can convey four separate messages without bypassing the safety level of 5 – four aces or none with 5, one ace with 5, two aces with 5 and three aces with 5.

But what if the agreed trump suit is clubs? Suppose that asker and teller each have one ace. Then, after 4NT, teller bids 5 to show his ace, and the partnership has to play 6 off two aces (or possibly 5NT, which could be worse than 6, if it has the machinery).

The problem can also occur when the agreed trump suit is diamonds, although it is less likely because there is more space available for responses than when the agreed trump suit is clubs. But if the partnership is using Roman Key-Card Blackwood there can be similar problems. Suppose that hearts is agreed, asker has one ace and teller has one ace plus the king and queen of hearts. Asker bids 4NT and teller bids 5 to show two key cards plus the trump queen, and the partnership is again too high.

The problem is that Blackwood ignores the USP. The lower in rank the agreed trump suit, the more space that is needed if the partnership is to stay at or below a safety level.

The Kickback ace-asking convention deals with the problem by adjusting the asking bid according to which suit is agreed as trump. The ask is always one step above four of the trump suit. So, if clubs is agreed, the ask is 4; if diamonds is agreed, 4 asks; if hearts, 4; and if spades, 4NT.

The responses to the ask might be similar to Blackwood, but instead of associating a specific suit with a specific number of aces, the responses are in terms of the number of steps above the ask. If spades will be trump, 4NT is the ask, and then 5, one step, might show zero or four aces, according to partnership agreement. If diamonds will be trump, 4 is the ask, and then 4, one step above the ask, might show zero or four aces.

The effect is to allocate bidding space where it is most useful in the context of the convention. If clubs is agreed and each partner has one ace, asker bids 4 and teller bids 4 to show one ace. The partnership can now easily sign off in 5.

There is a cost, of course: the partnership that plays Kickback loses the ability to cue-bid the ace of the suit above trumps. That is, assuming that hearts will be trumps, asker can no longer bid 4 to show first round control of spades: that would be the Kickback asking bid.

The solution is to use 4NT to show a first round control in the Kickback asking suit. With diamonds agreed, 4 is the Kickback ask, and 4NT shows the A or, if credible in the context of the prior bidding, a void.

The agreement that 4NT is a cue-bid still entails a cost, but Kickback users argue that there is a net gain. For example, with clubs agreed, South would bid 4NT to show a first round control in diamonds. This bid not only bypasses the Kickback ask (4), but also prevents North from cue-bidding 4 or 4. Kickback users believe that the gain in space from adjusting the ace-ask outweighs getting in the way of partner's cue-bid.

Notice that the Gerber convention, the use of 4 to ask for aces when NT is the likely final strain, is really a special case of Kickback.

The foregoing is meant only to illustrate the USP. It describes neither additional understandings that Kickback can accommodate, nor the special problems that can arise (for example, the question of which is the agreed trump suit).

The USP at lower levels: transfer responses to overcalls

Suppose that North opens a strong NT, North-South are playing Jacoby transfers, and South holds . South bids 2, hoping to pass North's 2.

The transfer gives the partnership plenty of space for any continuation it might have in mind. In contrast, the traditional bid of 2 as a signoff over 1NT means that the partnership must give up bidding space in order to make forcing bids that start at the three level. It is when South wants to sign off by bidding 2 directly that the smallest amount of bidding space is needed, but that bid takes away three steps (2, 2 and 2). Transfers, whatever costs they entail, tend to conform to the USP.

Now consider competitive bidding. Suppose that West opens 1, North overcalls 2 and East passes. South holds . Now:
If 3 is nonforcing all is well. South describes his hand and leaves the rest to North.
If 3 is forcing South must pass and possibly miss a good diamond contract. The  3 bid takes up so much space that, if it is forcing, South cannot show a weak hand with a good suit.

Again after 1 – (2) – P, South holds . Now:
If 3 is nonforcing South must cue bid 2 to prepare a rebid in diamonds. The hand is too strong to bid a nonforcing 3. But North's rebid, very often 3, may well prevent South from showing the diamonds below 3NT.
If 3 is forcing all is well on this hand, and if South has a heart fit and a good hand he can cue bid 2. In this sequence the cue-bid takes up minimal space – but how is that space to be used effectively when South has already shown a heart fit in a strong hand?

Regardless of the agreement on the forcing nature of 3 or 3 in this auction, there is a problem caused by the misallocation of bidding space. If 3 is forcing, a good diamond suit in a weak hand is problematic. If 3 is nonforcing, the ambiguous 2 cue-bid may well prompt a rebid by North that preempts South's diamonds.

The USP suggests that in responding to overcalls, a hand with at least invitational strength plus a fit for overcaller's suit make the highest level non-jump bid available. This frees lower bids to be used as natural and forcing, or as transfers – and the transfer buys space to show a weak, a game forcing, or even a slam invitational hand, just as do Jacoby transfers. So doing puts the bidding space where it is most needed – to complete the transfer and possibly to further describe the hand, and to make a natural, forcing new-suit bid below the cue-bid.

Those who play transfer advances of overcalls usually agree that the transfer bids begin with the cue-bid of opener's suit. Bids between the overcall and the cue-bid may be treated as natural and forcing; transfer bids are available to handle weaker hands with their own good suit.

For example, after 1 – (2) – P, some play this structure:
2 is natural and forcing
2, the cue bid, is a transfer to spades with strength to be clarified later
2 is a transfer to clubs – that is, a strong raise of partner's overcall
2NT is natural and nonforcing
3 is a limited natural raise

After 1 – (1) – P:
2 is natural and forcing
2 is natural and forcing
2, the cue bid, is a transfer to spades (this is the strong raise)
2 is a limited natural raise

Again, the point of the foregoing is to illustrate how application of the USP can make bidding agreements more effective, not to define an optimal structure for responding to overcalls.

References
 "The Useful Space Principle," The Bridge World, November 1980 – April 1981.

Contract bridge bidding